Comedy Feeds is a sitcom / sketch show featured on BBC Three since 2014. Each Comedy Feed showcases emerging new talent by making their pilot shows available exclusively on BBC iPlayer.

References

kklj

External links

2012 British television series debuts
2010s British comedy television series
2015 British television series endings
BBC television comedy
English-language television shows